The Ducati 160 Monza Junior is a  single cylinder bevel drive SOHC motorcycle produced by the Italian manufacturer Ducati from 1964 to 1970. The model was the most successful of the Ducati OHC singles. The exact number produced is not known, but estimates put the figure between 13,000 and 15,000. This exceeds the total number of all other Ducati singles produced from 1967 to 1975.

History
in 1955, Ducati engineer Fabio Taglioni designed a 98 cc SOHC single on which the range of Ducati singles was based. The 98 was soon enlarged to a 125. The American importers, Berliner Motor Corporation, felt a larger version of the machine would sell better in the American market. The announcement of Honda's soon to be introduced CB160 may also have been a factor. The 125's frame and cycle parts were retained and the machine was styled in a similar way to the 250 cc Monza. The machine was launched in 1964 as the 160 Monza Junior. Initial versions had a 3 speed gearbox but this was soon changed to a 4 speed unit.

A variant of the 160 with a more angular tank and mudguards was introduced in 1965, and the next year a more angular front headlight was added with a new seat. The styling then remained virtually unchanged until production ceased in 1970.

Most of Ducati's production was sent to the US, however in 1967 Berliner were in financial trouble and refused a consignment of 3,500 machines from the factory. These machines were sold to Liverpool businessman Bill Hannah, who sold the bikes to the public between 1968 and 1972. 1,500 of these were Monza Juniors, which were sold at 25% less than the same machines being sold by Ducati's UK importer Vic Camp. Hannah offered no support or spares network for the bikes he sold which damaged Ducati's reputation in the UK. The machines were under-geared which led to main bearing failures or dropped valves on some machines.

Technical details

Engine and transmission
The 160 engine was an enlarged version of the company's 125. The single cylinder bevel drive OHC engine was of unit construction and had alloy head and alloy barrels with cast iron liners. Main bearings were ball bearings with roller bearings for the big end. A Borgo 4 ring piston was fitted which gave a compression ratio of 8.2:1.

Fuel was delivered by a remote-float 22 mm Dell'Orto carburettor. The engine used wet sump lubrication.

Primary drive was by helical gears to a multi-plate wet clutch. Initially a 3 speed gearbox was fitted but this was soon changed to a 4 speed unit. Chain drive took power to the rear wheel.

Cycle parts
The single cradle frame was the same as the item used on the 125 and used the engine as a stressed member. Rear suspension was by swinging arm with twin shock absorbers. At the front  Marzocchi telescopic forks were fitted. Brakes were drums, the front being  diameter front and  rear. 16 inch wire wheels were fitted with a 275x16 tyre front and 325x16 rear.

References

Bibliography

External links
  (Round tank version)
  (Angular tank version)

Monza Junior
Standard motorcycles
Motorcycles introduced in 1964
Single-cylinder motorcycles